William Hall (February 11, 1775October 7, 1856) was an American politician who served as the seventh Governor of the state of Tennessee from April to October 1829.

Hall ascended to the office when Governor Sam Houston resigned amidst a scandal, and, as Speaker of the Tennessee Senate, he was the first in the line of succession.  After finishing Houston's term, he did not seek reelection. Hall had previously served in the Tennessee state legislature, both in the House and Senate. Following his brief term as governor, he served one term in the United States House of Representatives.

Early life
Hall was born in Surry County in the Province of North Carolina. He was the son of Major William Hall and Elizabeth Thankful Doak.  In 1779, the family moved to the New River Valley of Virginia.  In 1785, they moved again, this time to a tract of land that would eventually be known as "Locustland," near modern Castalian Springs, Tennessee.  Locustland would remain Hall's residence for much of the remainder of his life.

The Cherokee–American wars were raging at this time, and the Sumner County area north of Nashville was particularly vulnerable.  On June 3, 1787, William's brother, James, was killed as the two were ambushed as they walked through a field, though William managed to escape.  Two months later, as the family was moving its possessions into nearby Bledsoe's Station in anticipation of a Chickamauga Cherokee attack, they were again ambushed.  William's brother, Richard, brother-in-law, Charles Morgan, and father were killed.  William, along with his mother and two younger siblings, John and Prudence, managed to make it into the fort.

Career
During the early 1790s, Hall served as sheriff of Sumner County.  In 1796, he was promoted to the rank of major in the Sumner County militia.  He served in the Tennessee House of Representatives from 1797 until 1805.

At the outbreak of the War of 1812, he joined the Tennessee Volunteer Infantry with the rank of colonel, and had achieved the rank of brigadier general by the following year.

In 1821, Hall was elected to the Tennessee Senate.  In 1827, he was chosen as speaker of the senate. In April 1829, Sam Houston resigned the governorship following a personal scandal.  As Speaker of the Senate, Hall was the first in the line of succession, and thus became governor on April 16. He did not seek reelection, however, and Houston's predecessor, William Carroll, was elected without opposition a few months later.  During his brief time in office, Hall continued with the reform plans that Carroll and Houston had started.

An ally of Andrew Jackson, Hall later served in the U.S. House of Representatives for one term (1831–1833) (Twenty-second Congress) and then retired from public life.

Death
Hall died at his farm, Locustland, in Sumner County, a few weeks after giving an account of his frontier experiences for the June 1856 issue of Southwestern Monthly. He is interred at the family cemetery there.

References

External links

 National Governors Association
 The Tennessee Encyclopedia of History and Culture
 
 Tennessee Portrait Project

1775 births
1856 deaths
Democratic Party governors of Tennessee
Democratic Party members of the Tennessee House of Representatives
Democratic Party Tennessee state senators
People of the Creek War
People from Sumner County, Tennessee
Jacksonian members of the United States House of Representatives from Tennessee
19th-century American politicians